Tartuffe, or The Impostor, or The Hypocrite, first performed in 1664, is a theatrical comedy by Molière. The characters of Tartuffe, Elmire, and Orgon are considered among the greatest classical theatre roles.

History
Molière performed his first version of Tartuffe in 1664.  Almost immediately following its performance that same year at Versailles' grand fêtes (The Party of the Delights of the Enchanted Island/Les fêtes des plaisirs de l'ile enchantée), King Louis XIV suppressed it, probably due to the influence of the archbishop of Paris, Paul Philippe Hardouin de Beaumont de Péréfixe, who was the King's confessor and had been his tutor. While the king had little personal interest in suppressing the play, he did so because, as stated in the official account of the fête:
although it was found to be extremely diverting, the king recognized so much conformity between those that a true devotion leads on the path to heaven and those that a vain ostentation of some good works does not prevent from committing some bad ones, that his extreme delicacy to religious matters can not suffer this resemblance of vice to virtue, which could be mistaken for each other; although one does not doubt the good intentions of the author, even so he forbids it in public, and deprived himself of this pleasure, in order not to allow it to be abused by others, less capable of making a just discernment of it.

As a result of Molière's play, contemporary French and English both use the word "tartuffe" to designate a hypocrite who ostensibly and exaggeratedly feigns virtue, especially religious virtue. The play is written entirely in twelve-syllable lines (alexandrines) of rhyming couplets — 1,962 lines total.

Characters

Plot
Orgon's family is up in arms because Orgon and his mother have fallen under the influence of Tartuffe, a pious fraud (and a vagrant prior to Orgon's help).  Tartuffe pretends to be pious and to speak with divine authority, and Orgon and his mother no longer take any action without first consulting him.

Tartuffe's antics do not fool the rest of the family or their friends; they detest him. Orgon raises the stakes when he announces that Tartuffe will marry Orgon's daughter Mariane (who is already engaged to Valère).  Mariane becomes very upset at this news, and the rest of the family realizes how deeply Tartuffe has embedded himself into the family.

In an effort to show Orgon how awful Tartuffe really is, the family devises a scheme to trap Tartuffe into confessing to Elmire (Orgon's wife) his desire for her. As a pious man and a guest, he should have no such feelings for the lady of the house, and the family hopes that after such a confession, Orgon will throw Tartuffe out of the house. Indeed, Tartuffe does try to seduce Elmire, but their interview is interrupted when Orgon's son Damis, who has been eavesdropping, is no longer able to control his boiling indignation and jumps out of his hiding place to denounce Tartuffe. 

Tartuffe is at first shocked but recovers very well.  When Orgon enters the room and Damis triumphantly tells him what happened, Tartuffe uses reverse psychology and accuses himself of being the worst sinner:

Yes, my brother, I am wicked, guilty.
A miserable sinner just full of iniquity.
Orgon is convinced that Damis was lying and banishes him from the house. Tartuffe even convinces Orgon to order that, to teach Damis a lesson, Tartuffe should be around Elmire more than ever. As a gift to Tartuffe and further punishment to Damis and the rest of his family, Orgon signs over all his worldly possessions to Tartuffe.

In a later scene, Elmire challenges Orgon to be witness to a meeting between her and Tartuffe. Orgon, ever easily convinced, decides to hide under a table in the same room, confident that Elmire is wrong. He overhears Elmire resisting Tartuffe's very forward advances. When Tartuffe has incriminated himself definitively and is dangerously close to violating Elmire, Orgon comes out from under the table and orders Tartuffe out of his house. The wily guest means to stay, and Tartuffe finally shows his hand. It turns out that earlier, before the events of the play, Orgon had admitted to Tartuffe that he had possession of a box of incriminating letters (written by a friend, not by him). Tartuffe had taken charge and possession of this box, and now tells Orgon that he (Orgon) will be the one to leave. Tartuffe takes his temporary leave. Orgon's family tries to decide what to do. Very soon, Monsieur Loyal shows up with a message from Tartuffe and the court itself; they must exit the house because it now belongs to Tartuffe. Dorine makes fun of Monsieur Loyal's name, mocking his fake loyalty. Even Madame Pernelle, who had refused to believe any ill about Tartuffe even in the face of her son's actually witnessing it, has become convinced of Tartuffe's duplicity.

No sooner does Monsieur Loyal leave than Valère rushes in with the news that Tartuffe has denounced Orgon for aiding and assisting a traitor by keeping the incriminating letters and that Orgon is about to be arrested. Before Orgon can flee, Tartuffe arrives with an officer, but to his surprise, the officer arrests him instead. The officer explains that the enlightened King Louis XIV—who is not mentioned by name—has heard of the injustices happening in the house and, appalled by Tartuffe's treachery towards Orgon, has ordered Tartuffe's arrest instead. It is revealed that Tartuffe has a long criminal history and has often changed his name to avoid being caught. As a reward for Orgon's previous good services, the king not only forgives him for keeping the letters but also invalidates the deed that gave Tartuffe possession of Orgon's house and possessions. The entire family is thankful that it has escaped the mortification of both Orgon's potential disgrace and their dispossession. The drama ends well, and Orgon announces the upcoming wedding of Valère and Mariane. The surprise twist ending, in which everything is set right by the unexpected benevolent intervention of the heretofore unseen king, is considered a notable modern-day example of the classical theatrical plot device deus ex machina.

Controversy
Though Tartuffe was received well by the public and even by Louis XIV, it immediately sparked conflict amongst many different groups who were offended by the play's portrayal of someone who was outwardly pious but fundamentally mercenary, lecherous, and deceitful; and who uses their profession of piety to prey on others. The factions opposed to Molière's work included part of the hierarchy of the French Roman Catholic Church, members of upper-class French society, and the illegal underground organization called the Compagnie du Saint-Sacrement. Tartuffes popularity was cut short when the archbishop of Paris Péréfixe issued an edict threatening excommunication for anyone who watched, performed in, or read the play. Molière attempted to assuage church officials by rewriting his play to seem more secular and less critical of religion, but the archbishop and other leading officials would not budge. The revised, second version of the play was called L'Imposteur and had a main character named Panulphe instead of Tartuffe, the only performance of which occurred in the Palais-Royal theatre on 5 August 1667. Immediately the following day, on 6 August, as the king was away from Paris, Guillaume de Lamoignon, first president of the Paris Parlement, censored public performances. 

Even throughout Molière's conflict with the church, Louis XIV continued to support the playwright; it is possible that without the King's support, Molière might have been excommunicated. Although public performances of the play were banned, private performances for the French aristocracy did occur. In 1669, after Molière's detractors lost much of their influence, he was finally allowed to perform the final version of his play. However, due to all the controversy surrounding Tartuffe, Molière mostly refrained from writing such incisive plays as this one again.

An ally of Molière (believed by Robert McBride to be François de La Mothe Le Vayer, but a hotly-debated point) responded to criticism of Tartuffe in 1667 with a Lettre sur la comédie de l'Imposteur. The anonymous author sought to defend the play to the public by describing the plot in detail and then rebutting two common arguments made for why the play was banned. The first being that theatrical works should not discuss religion at all; the second being that Tartuffe's actions on stage, followed by his pious speech, would make the audience think that they were to act as Tartuffe did. This section of letter contradicts the latter by describing how Tartuffe's actions are worthy of ridicule, in essence comic, and therefore by no means an endorsement.
 

Centuries later, when the satirical anticlerical magazine La Calotte started publication in 1906, its first editorial asserted that Laughter is the only weapon feared by the soldiers of Tartuffe; the new magazine proposed to effectively deploy that weapon, with articles and cartoons mercilessly lampooning the Catholic Church and its clergy.

Production history
The original version of the play was in three acts and was first staged on 12 May 1664 at the Palace of Versailles' Cour de Marbre as part of festivities known as Les Plaisirs de l'île enchantée. Because of the attacks on the play and the ban that was placed on it, this version was never published, and no text has survived, giving rise to much speculation as to whether it was a work in progress or a finished piece. Many writers believe it consisted of the first three acts of the final version, while John Cairncross has proposed that acts 1, 3, and 4 were performed. Although the original version could not be played publicly, it could be given privately, and it was seen on 25 September 1664 in Villers-Cotterêts, for Louis' brother Philippe I, Duke of Orléans, aka Monsieur and 29 November 1664 at the Château du Raincy, for the veteran of the Fronde, Armand de Bourbon, Prince of Conti.

The second version, L'Imposteur, was in five acts and performed only once, on 5 August 1667 in the Théâtre du Palais-Royal. On 11 August, before any additional performances, the Archbishop of Paris Péréfixe banned this version also. The largely-final, revised third version in five acts, under the title Tartuffe, ou L'Imposteur, appeared on 5 February 1669 at the Palais-Royal theatre and was highly successful. This version was published and is the one that is generally performed today.

Modern productions
Since Molière's time, Tartuffe has stayed on the repertoire of the Comédie-Française, where it is its most performed play.

The Russian theatre practitioner Constantin Stanislavski was working on a production of Tartuffe when he died in 1938. It was completed by Mikhail Kedrov and opened on 4 December 1939.

The first Broadway production took place at the ANTA Washington Square Theatre in New York and ran from 14 January 1965 to 22 May 1965. The cast included Hal Holbrook as M. Loyal, John Phillip Law as King's Officer, Laurence Luckinbill as Damis and Tony Lo Bianco as Sergeant.

The National Theatre Company performed a production in 1967 using the Richard Wilbur translation and featuring John Gielgud as Orgon, Robert Stephens as Tartuffe, Jeremy Brett as Valere, Derek Jacobi as The Officer and Joan Plowright as Dorine.

A production of Richard Wilbur's translation of the play opened at the Circle in the Square Theatre in 1977 and was re-staged for television the following year on PBS, with Donald Moffat replacing John Wood as Tartuffe, and co-starring Tammy Grimes and Patricia Elliott.

Charles Randolph-Wright staged a production of Tartuffe, July 1999, at American Conservatory Theater in San Francisco, which was set among affluent African Americans of Durham, North Carolina, in the 1950s.

A translation by Ranjit Bolt was staged at London's Playhouse Theatre in 1991 with Abigail Cruttenden, Paul Eddington, Jamie Glover, Felicity Kendal, Nicholas Le Prevost, John Sessions and Toby Stephens. Bolt's translation was later staged at London's National Theatre in 2002 with Margaret Tyzack as Madame Pernelle, Martin Clunes as Tartuffe, Clare Holman as Elmire, Julian Wadham as Cleante and David Threlfall as Orgon.

David Ball adapted Tartuffe for the Theatre de la Jeune Lune in 2006 and Dominique Serrand revived this production in 2015 in a coproduction with Berkeley Repertory Theatre, South Coast Repertory and the Shakespeare Theatre Company.

Liverpudlian poet Roger McGough's translation premièred at the Liverpool Playhouse in May 2008 and transferred subsequently to the Rose Theatre, Kingston.

The Royal Shakespeare Company produced a new version by Anil Gupta and Richard Pinto which relocated the story to the modern-day Pakistani-Muslim community of Sparkhill, Birmingham. It premiered at the Swan Theatre, Stratford-upon-Avon in September 2018 before transferring to Birmingham Repertory Theatre in October 2022.

Adaptations

Film
 The film Herr Tartüff was produced by Ufa in 1926. It was directed by F. W. Murnau and starred Emil Jannings as Tartuffe, Lil Dagover as Elmire and Werner Krauss as Orgon.
 Gérard Depardieu directed and starred in the title role of Le tartuffe, the 1984 French film version.
 The 2007 French film Molière contains many references, both direct and indirect, to Tartuffe, the most notable of which is that the character of Molière masquerades as a priest and calls himself "Tartuffe". The end of the film implies that Molière went on to write Tartuffe based on his experiences in the film.

Stage
The National Theatre, England, adapted this for stage in 1967 at The Old Vic Theatre, London. Translated by Richard Wilbur, directed by Tyrone Guthrie and ran for 39 performances, closing in 1969.
Tartuffe in Texas is set in Dallas, Texas; published in 2012 by Eldridge Publishing.
Bell Shakespeare Company, Tartuffe - The Hypocrite translated from original French by Justin Fleming in 2014 and earlier for Melbourne Theatre Company in 2008, with uniquely varied rhyming verse forms.
American Stage Theatre Company in St. Petersburg, Florida, adapted Tartuffe in 2016, staged in modern-day as a political satire, with Orgon, as a wealthy American businessman who entrusts his reputation and his fortune to up-and-coming politician, Tartuffe.
It was adapted for an Australian audience in the "post-truth" age by playwright Philip Kavanagh, performed by the State Theatre Company of South Australia and Brink Productions, October–November 2016 in Adelaide.
An adaptation in English rhyming couplets set in London in 2017 by Andrew Hilton and Dominic Power, premiered by Shakespeare at the Tobacco Factory and Tobacco Factory Theatres in Bristol, April–May 2017. Tartuffe a bogus business guru preying on old-school Tory politician in mid-life crisis.

Television
 Productions for French television were filmed in 1971, 1975, 1980, 1983 and 1998.
 On 28 November 1971, the BBC broadcast as part of their Play of the Month series a production directed by Basil Coleman using the Richard Wilbur translation and featuring Michael Hordern as Tartuffe, Mary Morris as Madame Pernelle and Patricia Routledge as Dorine.
 Donald Moffat starred in a 1978 videotaped PBS television production with Stefan Gierasch as Orgon, Tammy Grimes as Elmire, Ray Wise as Damis, Victor Garber as Valère and Geraldine Fitzgerald as Madame Pernelle.  The translation was by Richard Wilbur and the production was directed by Kirk Browning. Taped in a television studio without an audience, it originated at the Circle in the Square Theatre in New York in 1977, but with a slightly different cast – John Wood played Tartuffe in the Broadway version, and Madame Pernelle was played by Mildred Dunnock in that same production.
 The BBC adapted the Bill Alexander production for the Royal Shakespeare Company. This television version was first screened in the UK during November 1985 in the Theatre Night series with Antony Sher, Nigel Hawthorne and Alison Steadman reprising their stage roles (see "Modern Productions" above). While this television version does derive from the RSC's 1983 stage production, IMDb is inaccurate in dating this videotaped version from that year. The BFI Film & TV Database indicates the start date for this programme's production was in 1984, while the copyright date is for 1985.
The 2022 Birmingham Repertory Theatre version by Anil Gupta and Richard Pinto was broadcast on BBC Four on 12 March 2023. The production relocated the story to the modern-day Pakistani-Muslim community of Sparkhill, Birmingham and had previously been produced by the Royal Shakespeare Company in 2018.

Opera
 The composer Kirke Mechem based his opera Tartuffe on the play.

Audio
 On 10 December 1939, an hour-long adaptation was broadcast on the NBC radio series Great Plays.
 In 1968, Caedmon Records recorded and released on LP (TRS 332) a production performed that same year by the Stratford National Theatre of Canada as part of the Stratford Festival (see "Stratford Shakespeare Festival production history") using the Richard Wilbur translation and directed by Jean Gascon.  The cast included Douglas Rain as Orgon and William Hutt as Tartuffe.
 In 2009, BBC Radio 3 broadcast an adaptation directed by Gemma Bodinetz and translated by Roger McGough, based on the 2008 Liverpool Playhouse production (see "Modern Productions" above), with John Ramm as Tartuffe, Joseph Alessi as Orgon, Simon Coates as Cleante, Annabelle Dowler as Dorine, Rebecca Lacey as Elmire, Robert Hastie as Damis and Emily Pithon as Marianne.
 L.A. Theatre Works performed and recorded a production in 2010 with the Richard Wilbur translation and featuring Brian Bedford as Tartuffe, Martin Jarvis as Orgon. Alex Kingston as Elmire and John de Lancie as Cleante.

Notes

References

Sources
 Benedetti, Jean. 1999. Stanislavski: His Life and Art. Revised edition. Original edition published in 1988. London: Methuen. .
 Garreau, Joseph E. (1984). "Molière", vol. 3, pp. 397–418, in McGraw-Hill Encyclopedia of World Drama, Stanley Hochman, editor in chief. New York: McGraw-Hill. .
 Koppisch, Michael S. (2002). "Tartuffe, Le, ou l'Imposteur", pp. 450–456, in The Molière Encyclopedia, edited by James F. Gaines. Westport, Connecticut: Greenwood Press. .
 
Brockett, Oscar. 1964. "THE THEATER, an Introduction" published Holt, Rhinehart, and Winston. Inclusive of University of Iowa production, "Tartuffe", includes "The Set Designer", set design and Thesis, a three hundred year commemoration, "A Project in Scene Design and Stage Lighting for Moliere's Tartuffe", by Charles M. Watson, State University of Iowa, 1964.
The Misanthrope and Tartuffe by Molière, and Richard Wilbur 1965, 1993. A Harvest Book, Harcourt, Brace and Company, New York.
The Misanthrope, Tartuffe, and other Plays, by Molière, and Maya Slater 2001, Oxfords World Classics, Oxford University Press, Clays Ltd. 2008

External links

 
 Free Project Gutenberg etext of Tartuffe (in modern English verse)
 Tartuffe (original version) with approx. 1000 English annotations at Tailored Texts
 

1664 plays
Plays by Molière
Theatre controversies
Male characters in theatre
Comedy theatre characters
Characters in plays
Fictional French people
Theatre characters introduced in 1664